Terrence Françoise is a former member of the National Assembly of Seychelles.  A teacher by profession, he was a member of the National Assembly from 2007 to 2011. In 2016 he was named Chief Executive Officer of the Agency for National Human Resource Development.

Prior to being a member of the National Assembly, Françoise served as a teacher of Mathematics.

References

Year of birth missing (living people)
Living people
Members of the National Assembly (Seychelles)
People from Anse Royale
United Seychelles Party politicians